The Blue Veil is a 1951 American historical drama film directed by Curtis Bernhardt and starring Jane Wyman, Charles Laughton and Joan Blondell. It tells the story of a woman who spends her life caring for other people’s children, beginning just after World War I. The title refers to the headdresses once worn by governesses and nannies, colored blue to distinguish them from the white veils worn by medical nurses. The screenplay by Norman Corwin is based on a story by François Campaux, adapted for the French-language film Le Voile Bleu in 1942.

Plot
Following the death of her newborn baby, war widow LouLou Mason accepts a temporary two-week assignment as nursemaid to the infant son of corset manufacturer Frederick K. Begley, who lost his wife in childbirth. She ingratiates herself with the family and eventually becomes a permanent fixture. When she declines Frederick's proposal, he marries his secretary Alicia Torgersen, who fires LouLou following her honeymoon.

LouLou finds employment with wealthy Henry and Fleur Palfrey and begins to care for baby Robbie. Older son Harrison is expelled from boarding school due to poor grades and bad behavior and returns home with his tutor, Jerry Kean. When Jerry is offered a job in Beirut, he impulsively proposes to LouLou, who accepts. While waiting for his fiancée to pack, Jerry speaks to Fleur, who warns him about marrying a woman he barely knows. Having second thoughts, he suggests he and LouLou wait a few months before marrying, and she remains with the Palfreys.

Years pass, and LouLou is nursemaid to Stephanie, the twelve-year-old daughter of fading musical actress Annie Rawlins. When Annie is delayed at an audition and misses Stephanie's confirmation, the girl tells her friends LouLou is her mother. Realizing the girl has become too attached to her, Loulou decides to find work elsewhere.

Just prior to the start of World War II, LouLou accepts a job with Helen and Hugh Williams. Hugh joins the military and is injured in battle, prompting his wife to join him in England. Two years pass, and the widowed Helen, who still has not returned home, stops sending money to support her son Tony. LouLou accepts responsibility for the boy and raises him as her own. Years later, when Helen notifies her she is returning with her new husband, LouLou flees to Florida with Tony, but is arrested and charged with kidnapping. Although he is sympathetic to LouLou's situation, the district attorney is compelled by law to return Tony to Helen.

Now too old to be entrusted with the care of a baby, LouLou accepts a janitorial job in an elementary school in order to be close to children. When she visits an ophthalmologist, she discovers he is Robbie Palfrey, the now adult son of her former employers. Robbie invites her to his home for dinner the following week and arranges for all the children for whom she cared to be there with their spouses. As LouLou catches up with her former charges, Robbie announces he wants her to be the nanny for his own children.

Cast

Critical reception
Bosley Crowther of the New York Times called the film "a whoppingly banal tear-jerker [that] will lure multitudes of moviegoers who like nothing better than a good cry." He added, "Mr. Corwin's scenario, under Curtis Bernhardt's soupy direction, stretches Miss Wyman's situation...into a series of parchedly sunlit episodes, contrived to squeeze the heart and present this lady as a quivering-lipped saint. There is little in the way of wit, grit or, for that matter, real substance...Miss Wyman..has little to do herself except to age daintily. She exercises reasonable restraint but persevering sweetness with an iron halo in a grating two-hour gamut. And since Miss Wyman, like the rest of The Blue Veil, is so far removed from flesh and blood, we can only leave her and it to heaven."

Variety noted "Curtis Bernhardt's direction handles the drama surely, if at times a bit measured, and never strives for dramatic tricks beyond the level of the simple, warm story being told."

Awards and nominations

Box office
The film earned $2.2 million in rentals in the U.S. and Canada during 1951 and total rentals of $3,550,000, making a profit of $450,000.

In May 1952 it was reported the film had returned net earnings to Wald and Krasna of $800,000.

Radio adaptation
The Blue Veil was presented on Lux Radio Theatre November 24, 1952. The one-hour adaptation starred Wyman in her screen role.

References

External links

 
The Blue Veil at TV Guide (1987 review originally was published in The Motion Picture Guide)

1951 films
American historical drama films
American remakes of French films
Films scored by Franz Waxman
Films featuring a Best Drama Actress Golden Globe-winning performance
Films directed by Curtis Bernhardt
RKO Pictures films
1950s historical drama films
American black-and-white films
1950s English-language films
1950s American films